Thein Kyu is a Burmese dental professor who served as Rector of the University of Dental Medicine, Mandalay from 2010 to 2012 and in University of Dental Medicine, Yangon from 2012 to 2015. He is also the president of the Myanmar Dental Association (MDA) from 2016 to present.

Early life and education
Thein Kyu was born in Yangon, Myanmar. In 2015, he received an Honorary Doctorate from Tokyo Medical and Dental University.

See also
 Myanmar Dental Council

References

Burmese dental professors
1944 births
Living people
People from Yangon